Antonio Bevilacqua (born 18 April 1957) is an Italian racing cyclist. He rode in the 1982 Tour de France.

References

External links
 

1957 births
Living people
Italian male cyclists
Place of birth missing (living people)
Sportspeople from Pescara
Cyclists from Abruzzo